Humppa United is a 2008 album by the Finnish group Eläkeläiset. It consists of humppa cover versions of (relatively) popular songs.

Track listing 

 "Humppa tanaan" – 3:22 (Dead Kennedys - "Kill the Poor")
 "Humppakasanova" – 3:48 (Disco Ensemble - "Drop Dead Casanova")
 "Kukkuu-ukot" – 3:27  (Turbonegro - "Boys from Nowhere")
 "Humppamuoti" – 2:52 (Hanoi Rocks - "Fashion")
 "Äkäinen eläkeläinen" – 4:08 (Tom Robinson - "Glad to Be Gay")
 "Humppamissi" – 2:00 (The Damned - "Hit or Miss")
 "Puliukko" – 2:12 (Sam The Sham and the Pharaohs - "Wooly Bully")
 "Mummo" – 3:18 (The Temptations - "My Girl")
 "Humppakeksi" – 3:35 (Masters of Reality - "Domino")
 "Vaivaistalossa" – 3:35 (Amorphis - "House of Sleep")
 "Humppaholisti" – 2:05 (Pixies - "The Holiday Song")
 "Humppapuoskari" – 2:55 (Apocalyptica - "I'm Not Jesus")
 "Humppatähti" – 3:01 (Karl Bartos - "15 Minutes of Fame")
 "Humppaviikot" – 3:19 (Hard-Fi - "Living for the Weekend")
 "Tajuton humppa" – 3:52 (XTC - "Making Plans for Nigel")
 "Humppatauti" – 3:00 (The Nits - "In the Dutch Mountains")

Total time 52:00

References 
 The official home page of Eläkeläiset.  URL accessed on 24 September 2008.
Russian Eläkeläiset fanclub

2008 albums
Eläkeläiset albums